Reinthaler is a German surname. Notable people with the surname include:

Carl Martin Reinthaler (1822–1896), German organist, composer and conductor
Christian Reinthaler, Austrian ski jumper
Max Reinthaler (born 1995), Italian footballer

German-language surnames